Sharafudheen Abdulla, commonly known as Sharaf Abdulla, is a Maldivian film actor (born 4 August 1991).

Career
After completing education from his homeland, R. Meedhoo, Abdulla relocated to Male' in 2010, in search of a job opportunity. After working at several jobs, he joined a local television channel VTV, where he featured in a drama series developed by VTV and his talent was noticed by director Ilyas Waheed who offered him to play a significant role for his upcoming venture. Abdulla's first project was Waheed's crime thriller Nina, where he was roped in to play the lead role against Nuzuhath Shuaib. However, due to the COVID-19 pandemic, the release of the film got delayed indefinitely making path for his other releases. He made his career debut with Ilyas Waheed's four-part anthology web series Mazloom, which follows the lives of two survivors of alleged rape assaults. Reviewing from MuniAvas, Ahmed Rasheed praised the performance of Abdulla and wrote: "Though a new face, Sharaf has proved that he is here to stay, with his firm acting ability".

The following year, he worked with Ilyas Waheed for his horror thriller anthology web series Biruveri Vaahaka as Azaan, a newly wed husband who searches for his wife who disappears while on honeymoon. Upon release, the series received positive reviews from critics mostly pointing out the performance of the cast and writer-director Ilyas' creativity for merging horror folklore into an "engaging visual treat". His next project was Dark Rain Entertainment's revenge thriller anthology web series Dark Rain Chronicles where he played the role of a scammer.

Sharaf's first feature film, Hindhukolheh, produced by Dark Rain Entertainment was digitally released in 2023. In this film directed by Ali Shifau, Abdulla played the role Imran, a hopelessly Romeo who helps Kiara, a girl who recently loss her memory, to fulfill her long-held wishes. Starring opposite Aminath Rashfa, the film received mainly positive reviews from critics. Reviewing the film from Dhen, Aishath Areena called his performance "different" and "commendable" for portraying the appropriate emotions through facial expressions and vocal texture. The same year, he collaborated with Azhan Ibrahim for his crime thriller web series Mirai opposite Washiya Mohamed, where he played the role of a determined father seeking revenge for the murder of his small child.

Filmography

Feature film

Television

References 

Living people
People from Malé
21st-century Maldivian actors
Maldivian film actors
1991 births